Claudia Henkel (born 22 April 1983 in Pretoria, South Africa) is a South African beauty queen, who held the title Miss South Africa 2004. She competed in the Miss Universe 2005 pageant in Thailand and placed in the top fifteen.

References

External links
https://web.archive.org/web/20080914032905/http://www.claudiahenkel.co.za/

      

1983 births
Living people
Miss South Africa winners
Miss Universe 2005 contestants
People from Pretoria
South African beauty pageant winners
South African female models
White South African people